Shorea falciferoides, also known as yakal yamban in the Philippines, is a species of plant in the family Dipterocarpaceae. It is found in Borneo and the Philippines. It is threatened by habitat loss.

See also
List of Shorea species

References

Sources

falciferoides
Flora of Kalimantan
Critically endangered flora of Asia
Taxonomy articles created by Polbot
Trees of Borneo
Trees of the Philippines